The Katoor dynasty (also spelled Katur and Kator) was a dynasty, which along with its collateral branches ruled the sovereign, later princely state of Chitral and its neighbours in the eastern Hindu Kush region for over 450 years, from around 1570 until 1947. At the height its power under Mehtar Aman ul-Mulk the territory controlled by the dynasty extended from Asmar in the Kunar Valley to Sher Qilla in the Gilgit valley. The Mehtar of Chitral was an influential player in the power politics of the region as he acted as an intermediary between the rulers of Badakhshan, the Yousafzai pashtuns, the Maharaja of Kashmir and later the Amir of Afghanistan.

Origins
The name Katoor is an ancient one and has been in use long before the ancestor of the Katoors settled in Chitral in 1520. According to one theory, Katoor was a Kushan title of nobility. Katoor also means dragon in the archaic Bashgali dialect of Kohistani. The title of Shah Katoor was given to Mohtaram Shah, the first ruler of the house, by a local holy man who claimed that his bravery and integrity were reminiscent of the pre-Islamic Katoor rulers of the region.

Territorial expansion
When the dynasty was first founded by Shah Katoor, his domains included lower Chitral, Kunar Valley, Lot-Kuh, Torkhow and Mulkhow regions of upper Chitral. Under Shah Katoor the II, Mastuj and the Yasin Valley also came under Katoor domination. The Kati and Kom tribes of Kafiristan, tribes of Dir Kohistan, Swat Kohistan and Kalam paid a yearly tribute to the Mehtar. Shah Katoor the III invaded Wakhan in retaliation for a raid on Chitral from Wakhan, and forced the Mir of Wakhan to pay tribute as well. In 1876, Mehtar Aman ul-Mulk conquered the Ghizer and Puniyal and laid siege to the Dogra Garrison of the Maharaja of Kashmir in the Gilgit fort. During this time the tribes of Darel, Tangir and Kandia and the state of Nagar also paid tribute to the Mehtar of Chitral. The Katoor dynasty's influence reached its peak under Mehtar Aman ul-Mulk, when territories of Ghizer, Yasin and Ishkoman were conquered in 1880.

Rulers

The rulers of the Kator dynasty with the date of their accession

References

Further reading
 

History of Pakistan
History of Chitral
Mehtars of Chitral
Chitral
Princely rulers of Pakistan
Nawabs of Pakistan